Cornus sessilis is a species of dogwood known by the common names blackfruit cornel, blackfruit dogwood, and miner's dogwood. This is a shrub or small tree which is endemic to northern California, where it grows along streambanks in the Cascades, Sierra Nevada, and the coastal mountain ranges. It is a tree of the redwood understory in its native range. This dogwood may approach five meters in height at maximum. It is deciduous, bearing deeply veined oval green leaves in season which turn red before falling. Its inflorescence is a cluster of tiny greenish-yellow flowers surrounded by thick, pointed bracts. The fruit is a round drupe about a centimeter wide which is white when new and gradually turns shiny black. The fruit attracts many birds.

References

External links

 
 
 
 USDA Plants Profile
 Jepson Manual Treatment

sessilis
Flora of California
Flora without expected TNC conservation status